Steve Pinau (born 11 March 1988) is a French footballer who currently plays for Bromley.

Career
Pinau, a French youth international, started his career with Monaco, making two appearances in Ligue 1. He signed for Genoa on a four-year contract, but was almost immediately loaned to Hibernian. Genoa also paid Monaco €560,000 as training compensation.

Pinau made his debut for Hibs as a late substitute in a 1–1 draw at Inverness on 23 August 2008. He was restricted to substitute and reserve team appearances for Hibs, as he struggled to displace established forwards Steven Fletcher, Derek Riordan and Colin Nish. His only goal for Hibs was scored in a 4–3 defeat against Greenock Morton in the Scottish League Cup.

FC Lugano, the sister club of Geona, signed the French forward on loan for the 2009–10 season. After half-year with Lugano, he was loaned to AC Arles-Avignon.

Pinau then signed for Bromley on a short-term contract with the option to extend. This move was confirmed on 19 December 2015 after international clearance was obtained.

References

External links

French footballers
AS Monaco FC players
Genoa C.F.C. players
Hibernian F.C. players
FC Lugano players
AC Arlésien players
Aviron Bayonnais FC players
Clermont Foot players
Rochester New York FC players
Ligue 1 players
Scottish Premier League players
French expatriate footballers
Expatriate footballers in Italy
Expatriate footballers in Scotland
Expatriate footballers in Switzerland
French expatriate sportspeople in Italy
French expatriate sportspeople in Scotland
French expatriate sportspeople in Switzerland
France youth international footballers
Footballers from Le Mans
Association football forwards
1988 births
Living people